Judge Bratton may refer to:

Howard C. Bratton (1922–2002), judge of the United States District Court for the District of New Mexico
Sam G. Bratton (1888–1963), judge of the United States Court of Appeals for the Tenth Circuit